Olesicampe is a genus of ichneumon wasps in the family Ichneumonidae. There are at least 130 described species in Olesicampe.

See also
 List of Olesicampe species

References

Further reading

External links

 

Campopleginae